Letheobia is a genus of blind snakes in the family Typhlopidae.

Geographic range
The genus is endemic to Africa.

Taxonomy
In 1869, the genus Letheobia was established by Edward Drinker Cope based primarily on two specimens of Letheobia pallida from Zanzibar, but later also including  Letheobia caeca (originally Onychocephalus cæcus Duméril, 1856) from Gabon.  Wilhelm Peters, in 1874 when describing Onychocephalus lumbriciformis from Zanzibar and in 1878 Typhlops unitaeniatus from Kenya, considered Letheobia to be a subgenus. Nonetheless, in 1881, Peters selected Letheobia caeca Duméril as the type species for the genus. In 1883, Boulenger decided that at best Letheobia was a subgenus of Typhlops, and placed it as a junior synonym. Later in reconstructing Rhinotyphlops in 1974, Roux-Estève moved all of Letheobia species into Rhinotyphlops, mostly into her Groups IV, V and VI. However, molecular studies in the 2000s showed that Rhinotyphlops, as conceived by Roux-Estève (1974), was polyphyletic, and that many if not all of Groups V and VI constituted a separate genus, for which the name Letheobia had priority. In 2007 Broadley and Wallach formally revived the genus Letheobia.  In 2013, Pyron et al. considered with some certainty that Letheobia was a sister group to the combined genera Afrotyphlops and Megatyphlops, while the three were then sister to Rhinotyphlops, and the four were the sister to Typhlops.

Species
The genus Letheobia contains the following 37 species which are recognized as being valid.
Letheobia angeli 
Letheobia acutirostrata 
Letheobia akagerae 
Letheobia caeca 
Letheobia coecatus 
Letheobia crossii 
Letheobia debilis 
Letheobia decorosus 
Letheobia episcopus 
Letheobia erythraea 
Letheobia feae 
Letheobia gracilis 
Letheobia graueri 
Letheobia jubana 
Letheobia kibarae 
Letheobia largeni 
Letheobia leucosticta 
Letheobia lumbriciformis 
Letheobia manni 
Letheobia mbeerensis 
Letheobia newtoni 
Letheobia pallida 
Letheobia pauwelsi 
Letheobia pembana 
Letheobia praeocularis 
Letheobia rufescens 
Letheobia simonii 
Letheobia somalica 
Letheobia stejnegeri 
Letheobia sudanensis 
Letheobia swahilica 
Letheobia toritensis 
Letheobia uluguruensis 
Letheobia weidholzi 
Letheobia wittei 
Letheobia zenkeri 

Nota bene: A binomial authority in parentheses indicates that the species was originally described in a genus other than Letheobia.

Etymology
The specific name, pauwelsi, is in honor of Belgian herpetologist Olivier Sylvain Gérard Pauwels.

References

Further reading
Cope ED (1868). "Observations on REPTILES of the Old World. Art. II". Proc. Acad. Nat. Sci. Philadelphia 20: 316-323. (Letheobia, new genus, p. 322).
Roux-Estève R (1974). "Révision systématique des Typhlopidae d'Afrique. Reptilia. Serpentes ". Mém. nation. Hist. nat., Paris, (sér. A) 87: 1-313. (in French).

 
Taxa named by Edward Drinker Cope